The men's 3000 metres team race was a track and field athletics event held as part of the athletics at the 1912 Summer Olympics programme.  It was the fourth appearance of a team race style event, though the first to be held at the distance of 3000 metres, which became the standard until the event was eliminated following the 1924 Summer Olympics. The competition was held on Friday, July 12, 1912, and on Saturday, July 13, 1912.

Twenty-four runners from five nations competed. NOCs could enter 1 team of 5 athletes, with up to 3 reserves.

According to the International Olympic Committee medal database all five runners were awarded medals.

Results

Semifinals

All three semi-finals were held on Friday, July 12, 1912.

Semifinal 1

Team result:

Individual race result:

Semifinal 2

Team result:

Individual race result:

All five Swedish runners finished side by side.

Semifinal 3

Great Britain had a walkover.

Team result:

Individual race result:

As there was no competition all five British runners ran and finished side by side.

Final

The final was held on Saturday, July 13, 1912.

Team result:

Individual race result:

References

 sports-reference.com
 
 

3000 metre team race
1912